"Faded" is the debut single by American electronic musician Zhu. An extended play of remixes was released on June 29, 2014. "Faded" peaked at number one on the US Dance chart.

One of the first radio stations to pick up "Faded", the alternative music orientated station Triple J, gave the song significant airplay which was responsible for its success in Australia. Subsequent to its success on Triple J, more mainstream stations began to play it, giving the song a larger audience. Eventually, "Faded" gained momentum internationally, becoming a club hit largely thanks to its initial success on Triple J. A black-and-white music video for the song was released on May 6, 2014. The track was nominated for Best Dance Recording at the 57th Annual Grammy Awards, but lost to "Rather Be" by Clean Bandit featuring Jess Glynne. Despite this, the song came to be one of Zhu's most successful singles to date since its release in 2014.

Track listing
Digital download

Remixes

Charts

Weekly charts

Year-end charts

Certifications

See also
 List of number-one dance singles of 2014 (U.S.)

References

2014 songs
2014 debut singles
Deep house songs
Black-and-white music videos
Spinnin' Records singles